Infusoria are minute freshwater life forms including ciliates, euglenoids, protozoa, unicellular algae and small invertebrates. Some authors (e.g., Bütschli) used the term as a synonym for Ciliophora. In modern formal classifications, the term is considered obsolete; the microorganisms previously included in the Infusoria are mostly assigned to the kingdom Protista.

In other contexts, the term is used to define various aquatic microorganisms found in decomposing matter.

Aquarium use
Infusoria are used by owners of aquaria to feed fish fry; because of its small size it can be used to rear newly hatched fry of many common aquarium species. Many home aquaria are unable to naturally supply sufficient infusoria for fish-rearing, so hobbyists may create and maintain their own supply cultures or use one of the many commercial cultures available. Infusoria can be cultured by soaking any decomposing vegetative matter such as papaya skin in a jar of aged (i.e., chlorine-free) water. The culture starts to proliferate in two to three days, depending on temperature and light received. The water first turns cloudy because of a rise in levels of bacteria, but clears up once the infusoria consume them. At this point, the infusoria are  usually visible to the naked eye as small, white motile specks.

See also
 Animalcules

References

Bibliography
 Ratcliff, Marc J. (2009). The Emergence of the Systematics of Infusoria. In: The Quest for the Invisible: Microscopy in the Enlightenment. Aldershot: Ashgate. infusoria dieses first identified in 18th 
sentury in 1773 by o.f.mular(zoologist)

External links

 Types of Protozoans and video
 Pond Life Identification Kit

Fishkeeping
Obsolete eukaryote taxa
Microscopic discoveries by Antonie van Leeuwenhoek